Thomas Grasso (born 11 August 2000) is an Italian artistic gymnast. At the 2021 World Artistic Gymnastics Championships in Kitakyushu he placed 4th in the vault event finals. At the 2022 Cottbus Apparatus World Cup event he placed 3rd in Floor Exercise.

Competitive history

References 

Living people
2000 births
Italian male artistic gymnasts
Sportspeople from Rimini